is a facility of the Japan Aerospace Exploration Agency (JAXA), located in the city of Kakuda in Miyagi Prefecture in northern Japan, specializing in the development and testing of rocket engines and space propulsion systems. The LE-5 (including the LE-5A/LE-5B version), and the LE-7 (including the LE-7A version) rocket enginese were developed at the Kakuda Space Center.

History
The predecessor to the Kakuda Space Center was established in 1965 as the "Kakuda Branch Laboratory" of the National Aerospace Laboratory of Japan under the aegis of the Science and Technology Agency. In 1978, the National Space Development Agency (NASDA) constructed the "Kakuda Rocket Development Center" on the same campus. Its purpose was to engage in basic research and development to raise the level of Japanese rocket propulsion technology. From the late 1980s, the Center also began research into space plane propulsion, especially scramjet technology and advanced materials research for reusable space engines.

In October 2003, the three separate Japanese space agencies, the Institute of Space and Astronautical Science (ISAS), the National Aerospace Laboratory (NAL), and NASDA, merged to form the Japan Aerospace Exploration Agency (JAXA). In 2005, the Kakuda Space Center was officially renamed the "Kakuda Space Propulsion Technology Research Center".

Facilities
Liquid hydrogen rocket engine test facility 
High pressure liquid oxygen turbo pump test facility
Rocket engine high altitude performance test facility
Ram jet engine test facility
High temperature shock tunnel
Cryogenic test facility
High altitude combustion test facility
Supply system comprehensive test facility

External links
home page

Space program of Japan
Space technology research institutes
Buildings and structures in Miyagi Prefecture
Kakuda, Miyagi